Alyaksandr Antonavich Anyukevich (born 10 April 1992) is a Belarusian professional football player currently playing for Neman Grodno.

Career
Born in Grodno, Anyukevich began playing football in FC Neman Grodno's youth system. He joined the senior team and made his Belarusian Premier League debut in 2010.

References

External links

1992 births
Living people
Belarusian footballers
Association football defenders
FC Neman Grodno players
FC Slutsk players